In the UK, railheading refers to the practice of travelling further than necessary to reach a rail service, typically by car.  The phenomenon is common among commuters seeking a more convenient journey.  Reasons for railheading include, but are not limited to, the following:

 Discounted fares may be available on another part of the route, but not from their local station - passengers may drive further to benefit from the discount.
 Where the local station is served less frequently, passengers may drive to a station with a more frequent service.  This is often the case on branch lines or at stations where most trains pass through rather than stop.

References

External links

Transport in the United Kingdom